Tomislav Brkić (born 9 March 1990) is a Bosnian professional tennis player. He has won one ATP doubles title with Serbian partner Nikola Ćaćić. Brkić achieved a career-high in doubles of World No. 37 on 23 May 2022. He is currently the captain and a member of the Bosnia and Herzegovina Davis Cup team.

Professional career

2021-2022: First ATP title, First Grand Slam quarterfinal, Three more finals, top 40 debut in doubles

2021 was the most successful year in Brkić’s career. Partnered with Nikola Ćaćić, he won his first ATP title at the 2021 Argentina Open and reached the final of the 2021 Andalucía Open and semifinal at 2021 Serbia Open.

On his Grand Slam debut, he reached the second round of the 2021 Australian Open partnering with Aisam-Ul-Haq Qureshi.

The pair Brkić/Ćaćić also reached the quarterfinals of the 2021 French Open for their best showing in their careers defeating 4th seeds M. Granollers/H. Zeballos and M. González/S. Bolelli en route.

On 17 January 2022 Brkić reached a career high of World No. 40 in doubles.

ATP career finals

Doubles: 5 (2 titles, 3 runner-ups)

Challenger and Futures finals

Singles: 30 (16–14)

Doubles: 55 (41–14)

Davis Cup

   indicates the outcome of the Davis Cup match followed by the score, date, place of event, the zonal classification and its phase, and the court surface.

References

External links
 
 
 

1990 births
Living people
Croats of Bosnia and Herzegovina
Bosnia and Herzegovina male tennis players
People from Ljubuški